Governor Rockefeller may refer to:

Jay Rockefeller (born 1937), 29th Governor of West Virginia, nephew of Nelson Rockefeller and Winthrop Rockefeller.
Nelson Rockefeller (1908–1979), 49th Governor of New York, brother of Winthrop Rockefeller.
Winthrop Rockefeller (1912–1973), 37th Governor of Arkansas